The Catholic Church in the Philippines or the Filipino Catholic Church is part of the worldwide Catholic Church, under the spiritual direction of the Pope and the Catholic Bishops' Conference of the Philippines (CBCP). The Philippines is one of the two nations in Asia having a substantial portion of the population professing the Catholic faith, along with East Timor, and has the third largest Catholic population in the world after Brazil and Mexico. The episcopal conference responsible in governing the faith is the Catholic Bishops' Conference of the Philippines.

Christianity was first brought to the Philippine islands by Spanish missionaries and settlers, who arrived in waves beginning in the early 16th century in Cebu. Compared to the Spanish colonial period, when Christianity was recognized as the state religion, the faith today is practiced in the context of a secular state. In 2015, it was estimated that 84 million Filipinos, or roughly 82.9% to 85% of the population, profess the Catholic faith.

History

Spanish Era

Starting in the 16th century Spanish explorers and settlers arrived in the Philippines with two major goals: to participate in the spice trade which was previously dominated by Portugal, and to evangelize to nearby civilizations, such as China. While many historians claim that the first Mass in the islands was held on Easter Sunday of 1521 on a small island near the present day Bukidnon Province, the exact location is disputed. A verified Mass was held at the island-port of Mazaua on Easter Sunday, March 31, 1521, as recorded by the Venetian diarist Antonio Pigafetta, who travelled to the islands in 1521 on the Spanish expedition led by Ferdinand Magellan.

Later, the Legazpi expedition of 1565 that was organized from Mexico City marked the beginning of the Hispanisation of the Philippines, beginning with Cebu. This expedition was an effort to occupy the islands with as little conflict as possible, ordered by Phillip II. Lieutenant Legazpi set up colonies in an effort to make peace with the natives and achieve swift conquest.

Christianity expanded from Cebu when the remaining Spanish missionaries were forced westwards due to conflict with the Portuguese, and laid the foundations of the Christian community in the Panay between around 1560 to 1571. A year later the second batch of missionaries reached Cebu. The island became the ecclesiastical "seat" and the center for evangelization. Missionary Fray Alfonso Jimenez  traveled into the Camarines region through the islands of Masbate, Leyte, Samar, and Burias and centered the church on Naga City. He was named the first apostle of the region. By 1571 Fray Herrera, who was assigned as chaplain of Legazpi, advanced further north from Panay and founded the local Church community in Manila. Herrera travelled further in the Espiritu Santo and shipwrecked in Catanduanes, where he died attempting to convert the natives. In 1572, the Spaniards led by Juan de Salcedo marched north from Manila with the second batch of Augustinian missionaries and pioneered the evangelization in the Ilocos (starting with Vigan) and the Cagayan regions.

Under the encomienda system, Filipinos had to pay tribute to the encomendero of the area, and in return the encomendero taught them the Christian faith and protected them from enemies. Although Spain had used this system in America, it did not work as effectively in the Philippines, and the missionaries were not as successful in converting the natives as they had hoped. In 1579, Bishop Salazar and clergymen were outraged because the encomenderos had abused their powers. Although the natives were resistant, they could not organize into a unified resistance towards the Spaniards, partly due to geography, ethno-linguistic differences.

Cultural impact

The Spaniards were disapproving of the lifestyle they observed in the natives. They blamed the influence of the Devil and desired to "liberate the natives from their evil ways". Over time, geographical limitations had shifted the natives into barangays, small kinship units consisting of about 30 to 100 families.

Each barangay had a mutable caste system, with any sub-classes varying from one barangay to the next. Generally, patriarchal lords and kings were called datus and rajas, while the mahárlika were the knight-like freedmen and the timawa were freedmen. The alipin or servile class were dependent on the upper classes, an arrangement regarded as slavery by the Spaniards. Intermarriage between the timawa and the alipin was permitted, which created a more or less flexible system of privileges and labor services. The Spaniards attempted to suppress this class system based on their interpretation that the dependent, servile class was an oppressed group. They failed at completely abolishing the system, but instead eventually worked to use it to their own advantage.

Religion and marriage were also issues that the Spanish missionaries wanted to reform. Polygyny was not uncommon, but was mostly confined to wealthier chieftains. Divorce and remarriage were also common as long as the reasons were justified. Accepted reasons for divorce included illness, infertility, or finding better potential to take as a spouse. The missionaries also disagreed with the practices of paying dowries, the "bride price" where the groom paid his father-in-law in gold, and "bride-service", in which the groom performed manual labor for the bride's family, a custom which persisted until the late 20th century. Missionaries disapproved of these because they felt bride-price was an act of selling one's daughter, and labor services in the household of the father allowed premarital sex between the bride and groom, which contradicted Christian beliefs.

Pre-conquest, the natives had followed a variety of monotheistic and polytheistic faiths, often localized forms of Buddhism, Hinduism, Islam or Tantrism mixed with Animism.  Bathala (Tagalog – Central Luzon) or Laon (Visayan) was the ultimate creator deity above subordinate gods and goddesses. Natives Filipinos also worshiped nature and venerated the spirits of their ancestors, whom they propitiated with sacrifices. There was ritualistic drinking and many rituals aimed to cure certain illnesses. Magic and superstition were also practiced. The Spaniards saw themselves as liberating the natives from sinful practices and showing them the correct path to God.

In 1599, negotiation began between a number of lords and their freemen and the Spaniards. The native rulers agreed to submit to the rule of the Castilian king and convert to Christianity, and allow missionaries to spread the faith. In return, the Spaniards agreed to protect the natives from their enemies, mostly Japanese, Chinese, and Muslim pirates.

Difficulties

Several factors slowed the Spaniards' attempts to spread Christianity throughout the archipelago. The low number of missionaries on the island made it difficult to reach all the people and harder to convert them. This was also due to the fact that the route to the Philippines was a rigorous journey, and some clergy fell ill or waited years for an opportunity to travel there. For others, the climate difference once they arrived was unbearable. Other missionaries desired to go to Japan or China instead and some who remained were more interested in mercantilism. The Spaniards also came into conflict with the Chinese population in the Philippines. The Chinese had set up shops in the Parian (or bazaar) during the 1580s to trade silk and other goods for Mexican silver. The Spaniards anticipated revolts from the Chinese and were constantly suspicious of them. The Spanish government was highly dependent on the influx of silver from Mexico and Peru, since it supported the government in Manila, to continue the Christianization of the archipelago.

The most difficult challenges for the missionaries were the dispersion of the Filipinos and the wide variety of languages and dialects. The geographical isolation forced the Filipino population into numerous small villages, and every other province supported a different language. Furthermore, frequent privateering from Japanese Wokou pirates and slave-raiding by Muslims blocked Spanish attempts to Christianize the archipelago, and to offset the disruption of continuous warfare with them, the Spanish militarized the local populations, importing soldiers from Latin America, and constructed networks of fortresses across the islands. As the Spanish and their local allies were in a state of constant war against pirates and slavers, the Philippines became a drain on the Vice-royalty of New Spain in Mexico City, which paid to maintaining control of Las Islas Filipinas in lieu of the Spanish crown.

Religious orders

The Philippines is home to many of the world's major religious congregations, these include the Redemptorists, Augustinians, Recollects, Jesuits, Dominicans, Benedictines, Franciscans, Carmelites, Divine Word Missionaries, De La Salle Christian Brothers, Salesians of Don Bosco, the indigenous Religious of the Virgin Mary, and Clerics Regular of St. Paul are known as Barnabites.

During the Spanish colonial period, the five earliest regular orders assigned to Christianize the natives were the Augustinians, who came with Legazpi, the Discalced Franciscans (1578), the Jesuits (1581), the Dominican friars (1587) and the Augustinian Recollects (simply called the Recoletos, 1606). In 1594, all had agreed to cover a specific area of the archipelago to deal with the vast dispersion of the natives. The Augustinians and Franciscans mainly covered the Tagalog country while the Jesuits had a small area. The Dominicans encompassed the Parian. The provinces of Pampanga and Ilocos were assigned to the Augustinians. The province of Camarines went to the Franciscans. The Augustinians and Jesuits were also assigned the Visayan Islands. The Christian conquest had not reached Mindanao due to a highly resistant Muslim community that existed pre-conquest.

The task of the Spanish missionaries, however, was far from complete. By the seventeenth century, the Spaniards had created about 20 large villages and almost completely transformed the native lifestyle. For their Christian efforts, the Spaniards justified their actions by claiming that the small villages were a sign of barbarism and only bigger, more compact communities allowed for a richer understanding of Christianity. The Filipinos faced much coercion; the Spaniards knew little of native rituals. The layout of these villages was in gridiron form that allowed for easier navigation and more order. They were also spread far enough to allow for one cabecera or capital parish, and small visita chapels located throughout the villages in which clergy only stayed temporarily for Mass, rituals, or nuptials.

The Philippines served as a base for sending missions to other Asian and Pacific countries such as China, Japan, Formosa, Indochina, and Siam.

Indigenous resistance
The Filipinos to an extent resisted Christianisation because they felt an agricultural obligation and connection with their rice fields: large villages took away their resources and they feared the compact environment. This also took away from the encomienda system that depended on land, therefore, the encomenderos lost tributes. However, the missionaries continued their proselytising efforts, one strategy being targeting noble children. These scions of now-tributary monarchs and rulers were subjected to intense education in religious doctrine and the Spanish language, with the theory that they in turn could convert their elders, and eventually the nobleman's subjects.

Despite the progress of the Spaniards, it took many years for the natives to truly grasp key concepts of Christianity. In Catholicism, four main sacraments attracted the natives but only for ritualistic reasons, and they did not fully alter their lifestyle as the Spaniards had hoped. Baptism was believed to simply cure ailments, while Matrimony was a concept many natives could not understand and thus they violated the sanctity of monogamy. They were, however, allowed to keep the tradition of dowry, which was accepted into law; "bride-price" and "bride-service" were practiced by natives despite labels of heresy. Confession was required of everyone once a year, and the clergy used the  confessionario, a bilingual text aid, to help natives understand the rite's meaning and what they had to confess. Locals were initially apprehensive, but gradually used the rite to excuse excesses throughout the year. Communion was given out selectively, for this was one of the most important sacraments that the missionaries did not want to risk having the natives violate. To help their cause, evangelism was done in the native language.

The Doctrina Christiana is a book of catechism, the alphabet, and basic prayers in Tagalog (both in the Latin alphabet and Baybayin) and Spanish published in the 16th century.

American period: 1898–1946

When the Spanish clergy were driven out in 1898, there were so few indigenous clergy that the Catholic Church in the Philippines was in imminent danger of complete ruin. Under American administration, the situation was saved and the proper training of Filipino clergy was undertaken. In 1906, Jorge Barlin was consecrated as the Bishop of Nueva Caceres, making him the first Filipino bishop of the Catholic Church.

During the sovereignty of the United States, the American government implemented the separation of church and state, which reduced the significant political power exerted by the Church, which led to the establishment of other faiths (particularly Protestantism) within the country. A provision of the 1935 Philippine Constitution mimicked the First Amendment to the United States Constitution and added the sentences: "The exercise and enjoyment of religious profession and worship, without discrimination or preference, shall be forever allowed.  No religious test shall be required for the exercise of civil political rights."  But the Philippine experience has shown that this theoretical wall of separation has been crossed several times by secular authorities. 

It was during the American Period when newer religious orders arrived in the Philippines. The Spanish friars gradually fled by the hundreds and left parishes without pastors. This prompted bishops to ask for non-Spanish Religious Congregations to set up foundations in the Philippines and help augment the lack of pastors. The American Jesuits and other religious orders from their American province filled the void left by their Spanish counterparts, creating a counterbalance to the growth of Protestant congregations by American Protestant missionaries.

1946–present

After the war, most of the religious orders resumed their ecclesiastical duties and helped in the rehabilitation of towns and cities ravaged by war. Classes in Catholic schools run by religious orders resumed, with American priests specializing in academic and scientific fields fulfilling faculty roles until the mid-1970s. American and foreign bishops were gradually succeeded by Filipino bishops by the 1970s.

When the Philippines was placed under Martial Law by dictator Ferdinand Marcos, relations between Church and State changed dramatically, as some bishops expressly and openly opposed Martial Law. The turning point came in 1986 when the CBCP President then-Archbishop of Cebu Ricardo Cardinal Vidal appealed to the Filipinos and the bishops against the government and the fraudulent result of the snap election; with him was then-Archbishop of Manila Jaimé Cardinal Sin, who broadcast over Church-owned Radio Veritas a call for people to support anti-regime rebels. The people's response became what is now known as the People Power Revolution, which ousted Marcos.

Church and State today maintain generally cordial relations despite differing opinions over specific issues. With the guarantee of religious freedom in the Philippines, the Catholic clergy subsequently remained in the political background as a source of moral influence, especially during elections. Political candidates continue to court the clergy and religious leaders for support.

In the 21st century, Catholic practice ranges from traditional orthodoxy, to Folk Catholicism and Charismatic Catholicism. Of the roughly 84 million Filipino Catholics today, 37 percent are estimated to hear Mass regularly, 29 percent consider themselves very religious, and less than 10 percent ever think of leaving the church.

Amid the COVID-19 pandemic in March 2020, most liturgical services and spiritual activities from every diocese under the CBCP's jurisdiction transitioned to online broadcasting through the internet, television or radio, in response to the prohibition of mass gatherings during the enhanced community quarantine in Luzon. By June 2020, physical Holy Masses gradually resumed, but were suspended multiple times in response to multiple surges of cases between August 2020 and January 2022. By March 2022, restrictions have been eased, and the CBCP encouraged the faithful in October of that year to return attending Sunday Masses physically.

Internal movements

Catholic Charismatic Renewal
A number of Catholic Charismatic Renewal movements emerged vis-a-vis the Born-again movement during the 70s. The charismatic movement offered In-the-Spirit seminars in the early days, which have now evolved and have different names; they focus on the charismatic gifts of the Holy Spirit. Some of the charismatic movements were the Ang Ligaya ng Panginoon, Assumption Prayer Group, Couples for Christ, the Brotherhood of Christian Businessmen and Professionals, El Shaddai, Elim Communities, Kerygma, the Light of Jesus Family, Shalom, and Soldiers of Christ.

Neocatechumenal Way
The Catholic Church's Neocatechumenal Way in the Philippines has been established for more than 40 years. Membership in the Philippines now exceeds 35,000 persons in more than 1000 communities, with concentrations in Manila and Iloilo province. A neocatechumenal diocesan seminary, Redemptoris Mater, is located in Parañaque, while many families in mission are all over the islands. The Way has been mostly concentrated on evangelization initiatives under the authority of the local bishops.

Papal visits

 Pope Paul VI (1970) was the target of an assassination attempt at Manila International Airport in the Philippines in 1970. The assailant, a Bolivian surrealist painter named Benjamín Mendoza y Amor Flores, lunged toward Pope Paul with a kris, but was subdued.
 Pope John Paul II (1981 and 1995) returned for World Youth Day 1995 which was reported to have an attendance of around five million Filipino and foreign people in Rizal Park.
 Pope Francis (2015) visited the country on January 15–19, 2015, and was invited by Manila Archbishop Luis Antonio Tagle to return for the International Eucharistic Congress in Cebu in 2016. At the Mass at Manila's Quirino Grandstand inside Rizal Park on Sunday, January 18, 2015. the attendance was pegged at about six to seven million worshippers, making the event the highest number ever recorded in papal history according to Fr. Federico Lombardi, director of the Vatican Press Office.

Education

The Catholic Church is involved in education at all levels. It has founded and continues to sponsor hundreds of secondary and primary schools as well as a number of colleges and internationally known universities. The Jesuit Ateneo de Manila University, La Salle Brothers De La Salle University, and the Dominican University of Santo Tomas are listed in the "World's Best Colleges and Universities" in the Times Higher Education-QS World University Rankings.

Other prominent educational institutions in the country are Ateneo de Manila University, St. Scholastica's College Manila, Angeles University Foundation, Holy Angel University, Vincentian's Adamson University, Colegio de San Juan de Letran, University of San Carlos, University of San Jose – Recoletos, San Beda University, Saint Louis University, Saint Mary's University, St. Paul University System, Canossa School, San Pedro College, San Sebastian College – Recoletos de Manila, Ateneo de Davao University, Xavier University – Ateneo de Cagayan, University of St. La Salle, University of the Immaculate Conception, University of Notre Dame, Notre Dame of Marbel University, Notre Dame of Dadiangas University, Salesians of Don Bosco in the Philippines, Saint Mary's Academy of Nagcarlan, Sanctuario de San Antonio Children's Learning Center, and the University of San Agustin, La Consolacion College, Universidad de Santa Isabel, Ateneo de Naga University, University of Santo Tomas - Legazpi.

Political influence

The Catholic Church wields great influence on Philippine society and politics. Then-Archbishop of Cebu Ricardo Cardinal Vidal and then-Archbishop of Manila Jaime Cardinal Sin were influential during the People Power Revolution of 1986 against dictator Ferdinand E. Marcos. The Cebu Archbishop, who was president of the Catholic Bishops' Conference of the Philippines at that time, led the rest of the Philippine bishops and made a joint declaration against Marcos and the results of the snap election, while the Manila Archbishop appealed to the public via radio to march along Epifanio delos Santos Avenue in support of rebel forces. Some seven million people responded in what became known as the 1986 People Power Revolution, which lasted from February 22–25. The non-violent revolution drove Marcos out of power and into exile in Hawaii.

In 1989, President Corazon Aquino asked Cardinal Vidal to convince General Jose Comendador, who was sympathetic to the rebel forces fighting her government, to peacefully surrender. Cardinal Vidal's efforts averted what could have been a bloody coup.

In October 2000, Cardinal Sin expressed his dismay over the allegations of corruption against President Joseph Estrada. His call sparked the second EDSA Revolution, dubbed as "EDSA Dos". Cardinal Vidal personally asked Estrada to step down, to which he agreed at around 12:20 p.m. of January 20, 2001, after five continuous days of protest at the EDSA Shrine, and various parts of the Philippines and the world. Estrada's Vice-President, Gloria Macapagal-Arroyo, succeeded him and was sworn in on the terrace of the Shrine in front of Cardinal Sin.

On the death of Pope John Paul II in 2005, President Gloria Macapagal Arroyo declared three days of national mourning and was one of many dignitaries at his funeral in Vatican City. Political turmoil in the Philippines widened the rift between the State and the Church. Arroyo's press secretary Ignacio Bunye called the bishops and priests who attended an anti-Arroyo protest as hypocrites and "people who hide their true plans". 

In 2017, a USA Today reporter remarked that the Church reached its political peak in 1986 when it was instrumental in replacing the Marcos dictatorship.

The Church in the Philippines strongly opposed the Responsible Parenthood and Reproductive Health Act of 2012, commonly known as the RH Bill. The country's populace – 80% of which self-identify as Catholic – was deeply divided in its opinions over the issue.
Members of the Catholic Bishops Conference of the Philippines (CBCP) vehemently denounced and repeatedly attempted to block President Benigno Aquino III's plan to push for the passage of the reproductive health bill. The bill, which was popular among the public, was signed into law by Aquino, and was seen as a point of waning moral and political influence of the Catholic Church in the country.

During the Duterte administration, the Church in the Philippines has been vocally critical of extrajudicial killings taking place during the war on drugs, in what the Church sees as the administration's approval of the bloodshed. Efforts by the Church to rally public support against the administration's war on drugs were less effective due to Duterte's popularity and high trust rating. Some churches reportedly offered sanctuary to those who fear death due to the drug war violence.

During the 2022 presidential elections campaign, the church supported and endorsed the candidacy of vice president Leni Robredo in an effort to prevent Bongbong Marcos, son of dictator Ferdinand Marcos, from winning the election. Robredo won in 18 of the 86 dioceses in the country.

Marian devotion

The Philippines has shown a strong devotion to Mary, evidenced by her patronage of various towns and locales nationwide. Particularly, there are pilgrimage sites where each town venerates a specific title of Mary. With Spanish regalia, indigenous miracle stories, and Asian facial features, Filipino Catholics have created hybridized, localized images, the popular devotions to which have been recognized by various Popes.

Filipino Marian images with an established devotion have generally received a Canonical Coronation, with the icon's principal shrine being customarily elevated to the status of minor basilica. Below are some pilgrimage sites and the year they received a canonical blessing:

 Our Lady of the Abandoned (Nuestra Señora de los Desamparadós) Marikina – 2005
 Our Lady of La Leche  (Nuestra Señora de la Leche Y Buen Parto) Diocese of Imus, Silang, Cavite
 Our Lady of Aranzazu (Nuestra Señora de Aranzazu) San Mateo, Rizal – 2017
 Our Lady of Bigláng Awà (Nuestra Señora del Pronto Socorro) Boac, Marinduque – 1978
 Our Lady of Caysasay (Nuestra Señora de Caysásay) Taal, Batangas – 1954
 Our Lady of Charity (Nuestra Señora de Caridad) – Basilica Minore of Our Lady of Charity
 Bantay, Ilocos Sur – 1956
 Agoo, La Union – 1971
 Our Lady of the Assumption (Nuestra Señora dela Asuncion) Santa Maria Church, Santa Maria, Ilocos Sur
 Our Lady of Consolation (Nuestra Señora de Consolación y Correa) San Agustin Church, Intramuros, City of Manila
 Our Lady of the Divine Shepherdess (La Virgen Divina Pastora) Gapan, Nueva Ecija – 1964

 Our Lady of Namacpacan (Nuestra Señora de Namacpacan) Luna, La Union – 1959
 Our Lady of Buen Suceso (Parañaque) (Nuestra Señora del Buen Suceso de Parañaque) Parañaque – 2005
 Our Lady of Guadalupe (Nuestra Señora de Guadalupe) Pagsanjan, Laguna
 Our Lady of Guadalupe of Cebu (Nuestra Señora de Guadalupe de Cebú) Cebu City – 2006
 Our Lady of Guidance (Nuestra Señora de Guia) Ermita, City of Manila – 1955
 Our Lady of the Immaculate Conception of Pasig (Nuestra Señora de la Inmaculada Concepción de Pasig) Pasig – 2008
 Our Lady of Immaculate Conception (Nuestra Señora de La Inmaculada Concepción de Malabón) Malabon – 1986
 Our Lady of Immaculate Conception (Virgen Inmaculada Concepción de Malolos) Malolos, Bulacan – 2012
 Our Lady of La Naval (Nuestra Señora del Santísimo Rosario de la Naval de Manila) Quezon City – 1907
 Our Lady of Lourdes (Nuestra Señora de Lourdes) Quezon City – 1951
 Our Lady of Manaoag (Nuestra Señora del Santísimo Rosario de Manáoag) Manaoag, Pangasinan – 1926
 Our Lady of Orani (Nuestra Señora del Santo Rosario de Orani) – Orani, Bataan
 Our Lady of Peace and Good Voyage (Nuestra Señora de la Paz y Buen Viaje) Antipolo, Rizal – 1926
 Our Lady of Peñafráncia of Naga (Nuestra Señora de Peñafráncia de Naga) Naga City, Camarines Sur – 1924
 Our Lady of Peñafráncia of Manila (Nuestra Señora del Rosario de Río Pásig) Paco, City of Manila – 1985
 Our Lady of Piat (Nuestra Señora de Píat) Piat, Cagayan – 1954
 Our Lady of the Pillar (Nuestra Señora la Virgen del Pilar) Zamboanga City – 1960
 Our Lady of the Pillar of Imus (Nuestra Señora del Pilar de Imus) Imus, Cavite – 2012
 Our Lady of the Pillar of Manila (Nuestra Señora del Pilar de Manila) Santa Cruz, Manila – 2017
 Our Lady of the Rule (Nuestra Señora de la Regla) Opon, Cebu – 1954
 Our Lady of Solitude of Vaga Gate (Nuestra Señora de la Soledad de Porta Vaga) Cavite City
 Our Lady of Sorrows of Turúmba (Nuestra Señora de los Dolores de Turúmba) Pakil, Laguna
 Our Lady of the Candles (Nuestra Señora de la Candelária) Jaro, Iloilo City
 Our Mother of Perpetual Help (Nuestra Señora del Perpetuo Socorro) Baclaran, Parañaque
 Our Lady of Salvation (Nuestra Señora de la Salvación) Joroan, Tiwi, Albay
 Our Lady of Mercy (Nuestra Señora dela Merced) Novaliches, Quezon City
 Our Lady of Soterraña de Nieva, currently under the ownership of Imelda Marcos
 Virgen de los Remedios de Pampanga (Indu Ning Capaldanan) Archdiocese Of San Fernando Pampanga
 Our Lady of Hope of Palo (Nuestra Señora de la Esperanza) Archdiocese of Palo, Palo, Leyte
 Our Lady of the Rose de Macati (Nuestra Señora de la Rosa de Macati) Archdiocese of Manila,  Poblacion, Makati

Religious observances
Catholic holy days, such as Christmas and Good Friday, are observed as national holidays, with local saints' days being observed as holidays in different towns and cities. The Hispanic-influenced custom of holding fiestas in honor of patron saints have become an integral part of Filipino culture, as it allows for communal celebration while serving as a celebration of the town's existence. A nationwide fiesta occurs on the third Sunday of January, on the country-specific Feast of the Santo Niño de Cebú. Major festivals include the Sinulog Festival in Cebu City, the Ati-Atihan in Kalibo, Aklan, and the Dinagyang in Iloilo City.

With regard to most holy days of obligation, the Catholic Bishops' Conference of the Philippines (CBCP) granted dispensation for all the faithful who cannot attend Masses on these days, except for the following yuletide observances:
Solemnity of the Immaculate Conception on December 8,
Christmas Day
Solemnity of Mary, the Mother of God on January 1

In 2001, the CBCP also approved a reform in the liturgical calendar, which added to its list of obligatory memorials the Feasts of Our Lady of Guadalupe, Maximilian Kolbe, Rita of Cascia, Ezequiel Moreno and many others.

Missionary activities
The Philippines has been active in sending Catholic missionaries around the world and has been a training center for foreign priests and nuns.

To spread the Christian religion and the teachings of Jesus Christ, missionaries enter local communities. Depending on where a missionary or group of missionaries are travelling, their work will vary (international or local communities).

Filipino diaspora
Overseas Filipinos have spread Filipino culture worldwide, bringing Filipino Catholicism with them. Filipinos have established two shrines in the Chicago Metropolitan Area: one at St. Wenceslaus Church dedicated to Santo Niño de Cebú and another at St. Hedwig's with its statue to Our Lady of Manaoag. The Filipino community in the Archdiocese of New York has the San Lorenzo Ruiz Chapel (New York City) for its apostolate.

Ecclesiastical territories

The Catholic Church in the Philippines is organized into 72 dioceses in 16 Ecclesiastical Provinces, as well as 7 Apostolic Vicariates and a Military Ordinariate.

Dioceses

 Caceres
 Daet
 Legazpi
 Libmanan
 Masbate
 Sorsogon
 Virac
 Cagayan de Oro
 Butuan
 Malaybalay
 Surigao
 Tandag
 Capiz
 Kalibo
 Romblon
 Cebu
 Dumaguete
 Maasin
 Tagbilaran
 Talibon
 Cotabato
 Kidapawan
 Marbel
 Davao
 Digos
 Mati
 Tagum
 Jaro
 Bacolod
 Kabankalan
 San Carlos
 San Jose de Antique
 Lingayen–Dagupan
 Alaminos
 Cabanatuan
 San Fernando de La Union
 San Jose in Nueva Ecija
 Urdaneta
 Lipa
 Boac
 Gumaca
 Lucena
 Prelature of Infanta
 Manila
 Antipolo
 Cubao
 Imus
 Kalookan
 Malolos
 Novaliches
 Parañaque
 Pasig
 San Pablo
 Nueva Segovia 
 Baguio
 Bangued
 Laoag
 Ozamiz 
 Dipolog
 Iligan
 Pagadian
 Prelature of Marawi
 Palo 
 Borongan
 Calbayog
 Catarman
 Naval
 San Fernando 
 Balanga
 Iba
 Tarlac
 Tuguegarao 
 Ilagan
 Bayombong
 Prelature of Batanes
 Zamboanga
 Ipil
 Prelature of Isabela

Apostolic vicariates
 Bontoc-Lagawe
 Calapan
 Jolo
 Puerto Princesa
 San Jose de Mindoro
 Tabuk
 Taytay

Ordinariates
 Military Ordinariate of the Philippines

See also

 Christmas customs in the Philippines
 Culture of the Philippines
 Hispanic culture in The Philippines
 List of Catholic dioceses in the Philippines
 List of Filipino Saints, Blesseds, and Servants of God
 Separation of church and state in the Philippines

References

Bibliography

Further reading

External links
 Catholic Bishops' Conference of the Philippines
This article incorporates material from the U.S. Library of Congress and is available to the general public.
 On Religious Freedom in the Philippines by the U.S. Department of State
 The Catholic Church in the Philippines — GCatholic.org
 Catholic News from the Philippines — LiCAS.news

 
Philippines